Port Stephens Coaches is an Australian bus company operating services in Port Stephens and the Hunter Region.

History
In the 1940s, the Newcastle to Nelson Bay service was purchased by the Fogg family. In 1957, the route was purchased by Sid Fogg and renamed Port Stephens Coaches. At this stage the fleet consisted of six buses.

In 1972, Port Stephens Coaches commenced operating tours to the Hunter Valley vineyards. In 1986, an express service commenced between Nelson Bay and Sydney.

In the 2000s, a second depot was established in Sandgate. Buses based here are signwritten for Newcastle Coaches.

In 2019 the company introduced Hybrid Buses into its fleet.

Services
Since 2008, Port Stephens Coaches's services in Port Stephens have been part of Sydney Outer Metropolitan Bus Region 3.

Fleet
As at October 2014, the fleet consisted of 69 buses and coaches. Fleet livery is white, red and green. In 2012, the Transport for New South Wales white and blue livery was adopted for route buses.

Depots
Port Stephens operate depots in Anna Bay and Sandgate.

References

External links

Newcastle Coaches website
Showbus gallery

Bus companies of New South Wales
Transport in the Hunter Region
Transport companies established in 1957
1957 establishments in Australia